The Fernando Trujillo Sr. House, near Los Ojos, New Mexico, was built around 1880.  It was listed on the National Register of Historic Places in 1985.

It is Anglo-American Territorial in style.

References

		
National Register of Historic Places in Rio Arriba County, New Mexico
Houses completed in 1880